Rhap Salazar (born February 3, 1997) is a Filipino singer and former child actor. He has tied for first place in the 2010 Awit Awards in the category  “Best Performance by a New Male Recording Artist"  He has won two awards at the 13th World Championships of Performing Arts both the Junior Grand Champion Performer of the World and the Junior Grand Champion Solo Vocalist of the World.

He appeared on The Ellen DeGeneres Show aged 12.

Filmography

TV Shows

Movies

Endorsement/Commercial
Lucky Me Pancit Canton (2007)

Discography

Albums

Compilation albums

For Mak and the Dudes

Studio Album

External links
Official Website

References

1996 births
Living people
Star Magic
Filipino singer-songwriters
Participants in Philippine reality television series
Reality show winners
Singing talent show winners
21st-century Filipino male singers
ABS-CBN personalities
Star Music artists